San Carlos Water is a bay/fjord on the west coast of East Falkland, facing onto the Falkland Sound.

Name
Despite its Spanish-sounding name, there is a wide discrepancy with the Spanish usage, for in Spanish "Estrecho de San Carlos" refers to all of the much larger Falkland Sound, which runs between the two main islands of West Falkland and East Falkland.

The settlements of San Carlos and Port San Carlos on the Water, as well as San Carlos River, all take their names from the ship San Carlos, which visited in 1768.

Description 
San Carlos Water is a fjord-like inlet at an angle of 45° to the Falkland Sound coastline, thereby offering shelter from the weather in the Sound (which is itself sheltered from the South Atlantic by bluffs in the north and an archipelago in the south). The inlet is 9.3 miles (15 km) in length and for about half of its length, is about 1.2 miles (2 km) wide. The San Carlos settlement lies close to the head of the inlet.

The inlet has eight official anchorage points.

The smaller and shallower Port San Carlos is an inlet to the north of San Carlos Water.

Settlements
 Ajax Bay
 Campo Verde
 San Carlos
 Port San Carlos

History
San Carlos Water became notorious during the Falklands War as "Bomb Alley" during the Battle of San Carlos. British troops routed the Argentine land forces, but British ships were pounded by Argentine air raids. It was of crucial strategic value in the amphibious assault, and British invasion of Argentine-occupied East Falkland.

Along with Grantham Sound, it is one of the proposed East Falkland termini for the anticipated ferry to West Falkland.

Gallery

References

Bays of East Falkland